Abu al-Qasim Kashani (died after 1324) was a Persian historian from the Abu Tahir family, who was active during the late Ilkhanate era. He is notable for claiming that the vizier of the Ilkhanate, Rashid al-Din Hamadani, had stolen credit for the historical work Jami' al-tawarikh. Although modern scholarship regard Rashid al-Din as the overall author of the work, he is generally considered to have been aided by several assistants, including Kashani.

References

Sources 
 
 
  
 
 
 

14th-century deaths
People from Kashan
14th-century Iranian historians
Ilkhanate historians